Henosepilachna vigintioctopunctata  is  a species of beetle in the family Coccinellidae. It is commonly known as the 28-spotted potato ladybird or the Hadda beetle. It feeds on the foliage of potatoes and other solanaceous crops. It was previously called Epilachna vigintioctopunctata and is a cryptic species complex. It is very often confused with a closely related species, Henosepilachna vigintioctomaculata, which occurs in Russia, China, Japan, and Korea, and is given the same "common name".

Seasonal abundance and natural enemies 
Temperature and humidity strongly influence the seasonal abundance of this species; the population increases with increased minimum temperature, and higher relative humidity. However, this species has two natural enemies, Tetrastichus sp. and Pediobius foveolatus, that suppress the beetle population by parasitizing their larval and pupal stages.

Distribution
This species is native to southeastern Asia, primarily India, but has been accidentally introduced to other parts of the world, including Australia and New Zealand. It has also been recorded from Brazil and Argentina, beginning in 1996.

Economic significance
This species causes damage to agricultural crops primarily in the family Solanaceae, especially potatoes; other crops include pumpkin, turnips, radishes, beans and spinach.

Gallery

References

External links

The Epilachna vigintioctopunctata Complex

Coccinellidae
Agricultural pest insects
Beetles described in 1775
Taxa named by Johan Christian Fabricius